Indanan, officially the Municipality of Indanan (Tausūg: Kawman sin Indanan), is a 3rd class municipality in the province of Sulu, Philippines. According to the 2020 census, it has a population of 93,168 people.

Geography

Barangays
Indanan is politically subdivided into 34 barangays.

Climate

Demographics

Economy

References

External links
Indanan Profile at PhilAtlas.com
[ Philippine Standard Geographic Code]
Indanan Profile at the DTI Cities and Municipalities Competitive Index
Philippine Census Information

Municipalities of Sulu